Luigi Morleo (born 16 November 1970 in Mesagne, Province of Brindisi) is an Italian percussionist and composer of contemporary music, who lives in Bari and teaches at the Niccolò Piccinni Conservatory.

He uses varied musical and artistic styles like minimalism, rock-cross-over, folk-Pop, jazz, electronica and DJ.

Many of his works have been played by the Maracaibo Symphony Orchestra-Venezuela, Rome and the Lazio Orchestra-ITALY, Clermont-Ferrand Conservatoire Orchestre-France, Denver Young Artists Orchestra-USA, Orchestra Sinfonica Metropolitana di Bari-ITALY, Orchestra del Conservatorio di Monopoli-ITALY, Orchestra Sinfonica di Lecce e del Salento-ITALY, Halleiner KammerOrchester-Austria, Orchestra Filarmonica della Calabria-ITALY, at PASIC (Percussive Arts Society) in Nashville-USA, Federation Bells of Melbourne-Australia, and at the New York City Electroacoustic Music Festival-USA and Festival MUSLAB from Mexico, Festival Futura Electronic – France, Jasmin Vardimon Company from Ashford-UK, Percussion Ensemble from Academy of Music STANISLAW MONIUSZKO in Gdansk-Poland, Japanese Arts Network, Festival Atemporanea in Argentina. His son Mattia Vlad Morleo is also a musician and compositor.

Works
Morleo's works were published mainly by Morleo Editore (I), Henry Lemoine (F), Alfonce Production (F), HoneyRock (USA)

Stage works 
"The Food Opera" for soprano and ensemble
"Il Compleanno dell'Infanta" Opera – Story in Music for Actor, Choirboy and Ensemble

Orchestra works 
"Petru'" for violin, double bass, piano and orchestra
"Concerto per marimba e archi"
"Nessun Popolo Oppresso 2" Concerto for percussion and orchestra
"Nessun Popolo Oppresso 3" for orchestra
"Oltre La Linea Di Fuoco 4" Concerto for marimba and orchestra
"Suoni e Rumori Per I Popoli" for percussion and orchestra
"Concerto per i Popoli" for accordion and string orchestra
"Diversita' : NO LIMIT" for serpent and string orchestra
"Suite Salentina"	voce, percussioni e orchestra	
"Art No War 10"	Concerto for Nine Percussionists and Orchestra
"On Western Terror 1" Concerto for African Percussions Ensemble and Orchestra
"On Western Terror 8" Concerto for Taiko Ensemble and Orchestra
"Migranti 2.4"	Concerto for two Percussionists and Orchestra
"I Passiuna tu Christu’ “	For Mezzosoprano, Percussion and Orchestra
"For Shegue’ 10”	Concerto for Timpani and Orchestra

Choir works 
"Madre Divina" for choir and string quintet
"Messa Per I Popoli" for choir, four percussionists and orgel
"For Shegué 3" for choir, four percussionists and digital support

Ensemble works 
"Trileonson" for percussion and electronic instruments
"Uomo Minimale" for percussion, soprano and electronic instruments
"Verty" for saxophone and piano
"Capriccio Per Marimba"
"VaSiRo" for marimba	
"Mutante" for clarinet, piano, double bass, voice and electronic instruments
"Via D'acque E Dove" for clarinet, double bass, piano and electronic instruments
"Vipiafon" for violin and piano
"Cellharp" for cello and harp
"Scene Di Una Danza" for two percussionists
"Lavrea" for piano
"Kirkh" for violin, clarinet, cornet, marimba and electronic instruments
"Ifilegia" for vibraphone and marimba
"Vipiafon And Percussion" for violin], piano and percussion
"Libero Movimento" for violin, clarinet, double bass and piano
"Danza Latina" for saxophone quartet
"Profumo Di Un'elegia" per violin, viola, French horn and piano
"Pergan" for percussion and ensemble
"Eko" for marimba
"Per I Profughi Di Guerra 4" for saxophone and organ
"Fabbrica Di Un Pensiero Sezionato" for percussion and magnetic tape
"Per I Profughi Di Guerra 3" for marimba
"Per I Profughi Di Guerra 2" for flute and marimba
"Per I Profughi Di Guerra 1" for violin, flute, clarinet, guitar and percussion
"Per I Profughi Di Guerra 10" for marimba
"Le Rughe Del Deserto" for percussion and magnetic tape
"Klimt Fantasy" for percussion
"Ernst Elegy" for percussion
"Double Flames Of Love" for piano
"Escher Prelude" for vibraphone
"Wine Rite" for flute, bass clarinet, trombone, piano, violin, viola, cello and double bass
"Fanes For Aenea" for instruments and magnetic tape
"Warhol Rite" for percussion quartet
"Ifilegia Ii°" for percussion quartet
"Oltre La Linea Di Fuoco 10" for percussion and live electronics
"Oltre La Linea Di Fuoco 5" for percussion trio
"Per I Profughi Di Guerra 8" for vibraphone
"Oltre La Linea Di Fuoco 2" for timpani
"Paesaggio Mediterraneo" for violin, accordion, tuba and percussion
"Nessun Popolo Oppresso 4" for string trio
"Oltre La Linea Di Fuoco 7" for percussion and piano
"Nessun Popolo Oppresso 7" for marimba and guitar
"Nessun Popolo Oppresso 6" for snare drum and piano
"Nessun Popolo Oppresso 8" for two marimba
"Frida's Tango" for vibraphone
"Ernest Elegy" for vibraphone
"Concertante per i bambini del mondo" for timpani and piano
"Suite Lounge"	 violino, fisarmonica, bassotuba e percussioni	
"Hip" clarinetto e chitarra	
"ReComposed 2.3"	supporti elettronici	
"Aria"	flauto, vibrafono e trombone
"On Western Terror 4" for alto sax
"On Western Terror 6" for one performer and smartphone of the audience
"On Western Terror 7" for sound sculptures and digital audio support
"Migranti 2.5" for Vibraphone and smartphone
"For Shegué 9" for Kalimba and digital audio support
"Ridistribuire NoAltRight" for Hichiriki

Soundtracks

Frammento Orfico in 16mm of A.Amoroso d'Aragona
No Pasaran! in VHS of F.Grimaldi e P.D’orazio
The voyage of Aenea in DVD of L.Vernieri
Pinocchio in DVD of Jasmin Vardimon Company
Medusa in DVD of Jasmin Vardimon Company

Live Soundtracks

Omaggio a Volontè of Theo Angelopoulos
 La terre – L’Arlesienne – L’Hirondelle et la Mésange – Les travailleurs de la mer of André Antoine
Couch of Andy Warhol
Entr'acte of René Clair
La Natation of Jean Vigo
Opus II-III-IV of Walter Ruttmann
Studie n:6,7,8,11 of Oskar Fischinger
Le voyage dans la lune of Georges Méliès
Rhythmus 21 of Hans Richter
Emak Bakia of Man Ray
La Folie du docteur Tube of Abel Gance
The Seashell and the Clergyman of Germaine Dulac

Honours

 Artist of the Honorary Committee Percussive Arts Society (Italy)

References 

P.Ciarlantini - E.Carini – COMPOSIZIONI PER LEOPARDI – Edizioni del CNSL, 2000
F.Versienti – PASSAGGIO A SUD-EST – Edizioni Laterza, 2002
L.Morleo – IL GESTO MUSICALE – Morleo Editore, 2006
AA.VV. – CINEASTI DI PUGLIA – Edizioni del Sud, 2007
AA.VV. – OMBRE SONORE – Edizioni del Sud, 2008
Philip M.Parker – PERCUSSION Webster’s Quotations, Facts and Phrases – ICON Group International, Inc., 2008
L.Morleo – DAL SEGNO AL GESTO PERCUSSIVO – Morleo Editore, 2016

External links
MorleoEditore
classical-composers.org

1970 births
Living people
People from Mesagne
21st-century classical composers
Italian opera composers
Male opera composers
Italian classical composers
Italian male classical composers
21st-century Italian musicians
21st-century Italian male musicians